Moba is a town located in the Democratic Republic of the Congo in Tanganyika Province. It is the administrative center of Moba Territory.

Location

The Rafiki is the largest and most comfortable of the available ferry services.
A dirt road leads down from Kirungu to a jetty in Moba.

Moba lies just south of the Mulobozi river.
The Marungu highlands, a range of steep rugged hills, rises behind the town, bisected by the Mulobozi. 
The highest mountain in Moba is called Murumbi.

People

In 1984 Moba had a population of 25,463.
Its ethnic identity is mostly Tabwa.

History

The city was created in 1893 by White Fathers who established a post at nearby Kirungu which they called Baudoinville/Boudewijnstad after Prince Baudouin of Belgium.

Civil war and aftermath

During the Second Congo War (1998-2003) the region became a battle zone between government forces and rebel groups. 
The area between Pweto, Moba and Moliro has been called the "Triangle of Death".
In November 2000, DRC government troops with Interahamwe fighters, former Rwandan army troops now fighting for the DRC government and other allies launched an offensive. They captured positions held by the Congolese Rally for Democracy-Goma (RCD-Goma), such as Pweto, Pepa, and attacked Moba port. The RCD-Goma and Rwandan Patriotic Army (RPA) forces counter-attacked early in December 2000.
The Rwandans re-took Pweto and Moba early in December 2000.

On 1 August 2007 a mob of demonstrators assaulted United Nations military observers and damaged offices belonging to the UNHCR and sister agencies. The United Nations withdrew from the town and ceased repatriation of refugees living in Zambia.

Economy

There are no paved roads in the Moba area nor within several hundred kilometres of the town. Two dirt roads, frequently impassable in the rainy season, are the only access by land from the west and south.
Moba had long been without electricity. Since 1996, there is a small hydroelectric dam built to provide its population with electricity. This dam was sponsored by an Italian NGO, Mondo Gusto, on Ngandwe Fuamba river.

Economic activity in Moba is mostly farming, fishing and gold mining.

References

Populated places in Tanganyika Province
Populated places on Lake Tanganyika